Hendrik Rubeksen (born 1 November 1983) is a Faroese international footballer who plays club football for HB Tórshavn, as a defender.

Career 
He made his international debut for the Faroe Islands national football team in 2010.

References

External links

1983 births
Living people
Faroese footballers
Faroe Islands international footballers
B68 Toftir players
Argja Bóltfelag players
People from Tórshavn
Association football defenders